Burning Heart (1997) is an original novel written by Dave Stone and based on the long-running British science fiction television series Doctor Who. It features the Sixth Doctor and Peri.

Plot
In the disintegrating cosmopolitan society Habitat on Dramos, the situation is dire. Humans and aliens tensions are set to explode, barely kept in check by the Church of Adjudication, who through their OBERON system control all. Corruption of many kinds runs through Dramos, including its people, human and alien alike – mutating into something that could consume their world. And with the Doctor imprisoned and on trial, he may not be able to stop it...

Judge Dredd crossover
The book was originally planned to be a crossover with Judge Dredd (Virgin held the rights to the Judge Dredd novels at the time) but this plan was scrapped after the release of the 1995 film based on that character. The character of Dredd was replaced by one Adjudicator Joseph Craator.

References

1997 British novels
1997 science fiction novels
Virgin Missing Adventures
Sixth Doctor novels
Crossover novels
Novels by Dave Stone
Novels set on fictional planets
Fiction set in the 4th millennium